Maureen Harding Clark (born 3 January 1946) is an Irish jurist and judge. She has been a judge at the International Criminal Tribunal for the former Yugoslavia (ICTY), the International Criminal Court (ICC), the High Court of Ireland and is a member of the Supreme Court of the Khmer Rouge Tribunal in Cambodia. She was one of the few women criminal lawyers and has extensive experience both as a criminal lawyer and as a state prosecutor in Ireland.

Early life and education 
Clark was born to an Irish Catholic mother and a Scottish Presbyterian father in Scotland. When she was two years old, her family moved to Malaysia where she and her sister attended an English school run by French nuns. At the time she also learned Malay.  The school they attended in Malaysia was located in Bukit Nanas, Kuala Lumpur. When she was twelve years old, the family moved to Ireland where she attended the Muckross Park College in Dublin. In 1964, Clark began studying at the University of Lyon where she obtained a diploma in French language.

In 1965, Clark returned to Ireland and studied law at the University College Dublin, where she met her husband. Following her graduation with a BCL degree, she and her husband settled in the United States, where they had two children. After an amicable separation, she and the children returned to Ireland, where she followed up her studies at Trinity College Dublin. While at the university, her lecturer was Mary Robinson, who later became president of Ireland. In 1975, she completed her studies and became a Barrister-at-Law at the Honourable Society of King's Inns.

In 2021, she was made an honorary fellow of Trinity College Dublin.

Legal career 
Following her graduation in 1975 Clark was a barrister in the South Eastern Circuit in a variety of cases. In 1985 she assumed as the State Prosecutor for Tipperary. In 1991 she received the title of a Senior Counsel.  The same year, she quit her job in Tipperary and became a prosecutor at the Central Criminal Court in Ireland. She was described as "tough-minded", and "If she was prosecuting, you knew you were prosecuted". She led the prosecution in the first money-laundering trial in Europe, as well as the first marital rape and male rape trials in Ireland. In 2004 she was appointed a member of the Irish Human Rights Commission.

Judicial career

International tribunals 
In June 2001 Clark was elected as one of the 27 so-called ad litem judges at the International Criminal Tribunal for the former Yugoslavia (ICTY) by the General Assembly of the United Nations. She was assigned to a trial concerning human rights violations. By March 2003, her chamber had sentenced Mladen Naletilić Tuta to 20 years' and Vinko Martinovic to 18 years' imprisonment. In 2003 she assumed as a judge of the International Criminal Court (ICC) where she was tasked with the organization of the trials and the establishment of a judicial infrastructure. On 10 December 2006 she resigned from her post at the ICC to assume duties as a judge at the High Court of Ireland. In 2019, following her nomination by the UN secretary-general António Guterres, the King of Cambodia Norodom Sihamoni appointed Clark as a judge of the Supreme Court of the Khmer Rouge Tribunal, the court at which the leaders of the Cambodian Khmer Rouge are to be tried.

Irish High Court 
In December 2006 Clark became a Judge of the High Court of Ireland, a post she held until 2014. She was also the judicial visitor for the Trinity College Dublin between 2009 and 2020.

References 

1946 births
Living people
Irish jurists
Irish judges of international courts and tribunals
Alumni of University College Dublin
Alumni of Trinity College Dublin
High Court judges (Ireland)
Honorary Fellows of Trinity College Dublin
Irish women judges
Khmer Rouge Tribunal judges
International Criminal Tribunal for the former Yugoslavia judges
International Criminal Court judges
Alumni of King's Inns
21st-century Irish judges
21st-century women judges
Irish people of Scottish descent